Hélène Cattet and Bruno Forzani are husband-and-wife filmmakers based in Brussels, Belgium. They have worked as a writing and directing team for their entire professional film careers.

Their most acclaimed works include Amer (2009), The Strange Colour of Your Body's Tears (2013), and Let the Corpses Tan (2017).

Career 
Hélène Cattet, born in 1976 in Paris, and Bruno Forzani, born in the same year in Menton, France, met in Brussels in 1997 and moved there. After developing an interest in filmmaking, the couple directed a number self-produced short films, gaining critical attention in the independent festival circuit. Cattet and Forzani made their full-length debut in 2009 with Amer, an international coproduction between France and Belgium that was described as a postmodern homage to giallo films. The film received general acclaim from critics and earned the couple a Magritte Award nomination in the category of Best Film.

Cattet and Forzani then directed The Strange Colour of Your Body's Tears (2013), a thriller film starring Klaus Tange as a man who becomes entangled in a complicated web of lies and murder while seeking the whereabouts of his missing wife. The film polarized critics when it premiered at the 2013 Toronto International Film Festival, with Nicholas Bell from IndieWire calling it "one of the most cinematically extravagant explorations of the gaudy and grotesque ever committed to film".

Their next film, Let the Corpses Tan (2017), is an adaptation of the novel of the same name by Jean-Patrick Manchette and Jean-Pierre Bastid. It revolves around a gang of thieves who arrive at the home of an artist who is caught in a love triangle. The film received eight nominations at the 9th Magritte Awards, including Best Film and Best Director for Cattet and Forzani, winning three.

Filmography

References

External links 
 
 
 A Language of Their Own:  An Introduction to Hélène Cattet and Bruno Forzani

1976 births
Belgian film directors
Belgian film producers
Belgian screenwriters
Film directors from Paris
Filmmaking duos
Giallo film directors
French-language film directors
Living people
Married couples
Screenwriting duos